Sandy Island may refer to:

Australia
 Sandy Island (Lacepede Islands), Western Australia
 Sandy Island (Windy Harbour), Western Australia

Canada
 Sandy Island (Saskatchewan), Canada
 Sandy Island (British Columbia), in the List of islands of British Columbia
 Sandy Island Marine Provincial Park, British Columbia, Canada

Other places
 Sandy Island (Pitcairn Islands), in the Oeno Island atoll
 Sandy Island, South Carolina, United States, an unincorporated community and a larger island
 Sandy Island (Andaman and Nicobar Islands), Andaman and Nicobar Islands, India
 Düne, Heligoland, known in English as Sandy Island in the 19th century

Other uses
 Sandy Island, New Caledonia, a phantom island

See also
 Sandy Island and Low Rock Important Bird Area, Northern Territory, Australia
 Sandy Island Beach State Park, New York, United States
 Sandy Cay, an uninhabited island in the British Virgin Islands
 Sand Island (disambiguation)
 Sandy Islands (disambiguation)